The Oscar Wilde Centre is an academic research and teaching unit in Trinity College Dublin. It was founded in 1998, and is located at 21 Westland Row, the house in which Oscar Wilde was born. This building, which is on the perimeter of Trinity, was purchased in the 20th century as part of an expansion programme. The centre offers two post-graduate programmes: the MPhil in Irish writing, and another in creative writing – the first programme of its kind in Ireland. The centre was founded by the poets Brendan Kennelly and Gerald Dawe, who serves as the director. Richard Ford, a Pulitzer Prize-winning American writer, joined the staff in 2008 as an adjunct professor.

Since 2007 the centre also administers the Rooney Prize for Irish Literature, an annual prize for an Irish writer under 40.

References

External links 

Oscar Wilde Centre Website
Richard Ford is an adjunct professor

1998 establishments in Ireland
Archives in the Republic of Ireland
Trinity College Dublin
Educational institutions established in 1998

cy:Coleg y Drindod, Dulyn
da:Trinity College
de:Trinity College (Dublin)
es:Trinity College (Dublín)
eu:Trinity College (Dublin)
fr:Trinity College (Dublin)
ga:Coláiste na Tríonóide, Baile Átha Cliath
gv:Colleish ny Trinaid, Divlyn
it:Trinity College (Dublino)
he:טריניטי קולג' (דבלין)
lv:Trinitijas koledža (Dublina)
ja:トリニティ・カレッジ (ダブリン大学)
no:Trinity College (Dublin)
pl:Trinity College w Dublinie
pt:Trinity College, Dublin
ru:Тринити Колледж (Дублин)
fi:Trinity College (Dublin)
sv:Trinity College, Dublin